Van Dusen v. Barrack, 376 U.S. 612 (1964), was a United States Supreme Court case in which the Court held that when a case is transferred from a federal court in one state to a federal court in another, the choice of law should be that of the state in which the case was originally filed.

References

External links
 

United States Supreme Court cases
United States Supreme Court cases of the Warren Court
United States civil procedure case law
1964 in United States case law
Conflict of laws case law